Entasis is a Danish architecture firm based in Copenhagen. It takens its name from  the Greek word for tension.

History
Entasis was founded  by Christian and Signe Cold in 1996. Their first building, a new main entrance for Copenhagen Zoo, was awarded the AIA Prize 'Best Building in Europe 1998'.

In 2007 the firm won the open international competition for the redevelopment of the former Carlsberg brewery site in Copenhagen, with a proposal which, in reaction to Modernist planning, relied on dense, Medieval town centres for inspiration. An emphasis on physical density and the human scale are characteristic of their work. The same trend is seen in their entry for the Søtorvet competition in Silkeborg which they won in 2010.

Selected projects
 Main entrance, Copenhagen Zoo, Copenhagen (1998)
 Kildeskovshallen, Gentofte, Copenhagen (2000)
 Svanemøllen auditorium building, Danish Defense Academy, Copenhagen (2000)
 124 houses, Trekroner, Denmark (2002)
 Parish Council building, Riga, Latvia (2003)
 Emaljehaven housing, 2004
 50+ housing, Ørestad, Copenhagen (2005)
 Carlsberg masterplan, Copenhagen (2007)
 Spinderiet, Valby, Copenhagen (2007)
 Søtorvet masterplan, Silkeborg, Denmark (2010)

Awards
 1998 AIA Prize for Copenhagen Zoo main entrance
 2006 Eckersberg Medal
 2009 WAF Award (Future projects: Masterplanning category) for Carlsberg masterplan
 2009 Nykredit Architecture Prize

References

External links
 Official website
 Svanemøllen Auditorium at Copenhagen X

Architecture firms of Denmark
Architecture firms based in Copenhagen
Companies based in Copenhagen Municipality
Danish companies established in 1996
Design companies established in 1996